U. macrourus may refer to:
 Urocolius macrourus, the blue-naped mousebird, a bird species
 Urotriorchis macrourus, the long-tailed hawk, a bird of prey species

See also
 Macourus